William Pocock (1848 – 27 September 1928) was an English cricketer. He played eight first-class matches for New South Wales and Canterbury between 1872/73 and 1883/84. He was a cousin of W. G. Grace.

See also
 List of New South Wales representative cricketers

References

External links
 

1848 births
1928 deaths
English cricketers
New South Wales cricketers
Canterbury cricketers
Cricketers from Bristol
W. G. Grace
Grace family
English emigrants to colonial Australia